Zsófia Bán (born September 23, 1957, in Rio de Janeiro, Brazil) is a writer, literary historian, essayist and art and literature critic.

Personal life

Zsófia Bán grew up in Rio de Janeiro as the child of Jewish parents. In 1969, she and her family returned to Hungary where she studied English language and Literature as well as Romance Studies in Budapest (1976–1981), Lisbon, Minneapolis and New Brunswick. She has worked in film studios, curated art exhibitions, was a fellow at the Hungarian Academy of Sciences and at the John-F.-Kennedy-Institut in Berlin, a Fulbright Fellow at Harvard University, as well as a writer-in-residence in Zug, Switzerland, among other residencies. From August 2015 to July 2016 Bán was a writer-in-residence at the DAAD (German Academic Exchange Service) Artists-in-Berlin Program.

She lives and works in Budapest, where she was an associate professor of American Studies at the School of English and American Studies of the Faculty of Humanities of the Eötvös Loránd University. She is now a freelance writer.

Writing

Zsófia Bán's writing often addresses topics related to visuality, visual arts, photography, personal and cultural memory, historical trauma, as well as gender. She has written  a number of essays related to the topic of literature and visuality, including those on W.G. Sebald, Susan Sontag, Imre Kertész and Péter Nádas.
Her short stories and essays have been widely anthologized, and translated to a number of languages, including German, English, Spanish, Portuguese, Czech, Slovakian and Slovenian.

Bibliography

Fiction
Lehet lélegezni!, Budapest, Magvető, 2018.
Weiter atmen, übersetzt von Terézia Mora. Berlin, Suhrkamp Verlag, 2020. .
Amikor még csak az állatok éltek, Magvető, Budapest 2012. 
Als nur die Tiere lebten, translated by Terézia Mora, Berlin, Suhrkamp Verlag, 2014. 
Esti iskola – Olvasókönyv felnőtteknek, Budapest/ Bratislava, 2007. 
Abendschule – Eine Fibel für Erwachsene, translated by Terézia Mora, Suhrkamp Verlag, Berlin, 2012. 
Escuela nocturna – Manual de lectura para adultos, translated by José Miguel González Trevejo, Ediciones Siruela, Madrid, 2015. 
Night School: A Reader for Grownups, translated by Jim Tucker. Open Letter Books, Rochester, 2019.

Children’s literature
Vagánybagoly és a negyedik Á avagy mindenki láthat mást (Tuffy Owl and Class Four A or Everyone Can See Differently), 2021. 
Vagánybagoly és a harmadik Á avagy mindenki lehet más (Tuffy Owl and Class Three A or Everyone Can be Different), 2019.

Non-fiction
Der Sommer unsres Missvergnügens (essays on memory, history and visuality), Matthes & Seitz/DAAD, Berlin, 2019.
Turul és dínó (The Turul Bird and the Dino – essays on the visual representation of historical memory), Magvető, Budapest, 2016.
Exponált Emlék – Családi képek a magán- és közösségi emlékezetben, ed. Zsófia Bán and Hedvig Turai, AICA/Argumentum, Budapest, 2008. 
Exposed Memory: Family Pictures in Private and Collective Memory, AICA-CEU Press, Budapest, 2010. 
Próbacsomagolás (Test Packing, essays), Kalligram, Budapest/Bratislava, 2008. 
Amerikáner: A huszadik századi amerikai irodalom és mûvészet kultikus darabjai (Cult Works in American Literature and Art, essays), Magvető, Budapest, 2000.
Desire and De-Scription: Words and Images of Postmodernism in the Late Poetry of William Carlos Williams, Amsterdam, Rodopi, 1999. 

Zsófia Bán also regularly publishes critical pieces on literature and visual art, as well as op-eds in magazines and newspapers.

Prizes
2021: Spycher: Literature Award Leuk
2020: Best Children's Book of the Year Prize (Children's Jury)
2018: Acquisition Award, LOOP Barcelona Video Festival (co-created with Péter Forgács)
2014: International Literature Award (Shortlist)
2013: Glass Marble Prize 
2013: Aegon Prize (Shortlist)
2012: Tibor Déry Prize 
2009: Palládium Prize 
2009: Mozgó Világ Prize
2008: Aegon Prize (Shortlist)   
2008: Attila József Prize 
2007: Balassa Péter Prize

Links
 Zsófia Bán  – Official Website with selected publication list (Hungarian and English)
 Hungarian publishing house
 German publishing house
 Zsófia Bán at the Berlin International Literature Festival 2015
American Version of Night School
Review of Night School at Kirkus Review
Review of Night School at The Arkansas International
American Publishing House
A Night of Philosophy and Ideas
 Spycher Prize 2021 awarded to Zsófia Bán

20th-century Hungarian novelists
21st-century Hungarian novelists
People from Rio de Janeiro (city)
Writers from Budapest
1957 births
Hungarian literary critics
Hungarian women novelists
Living people
Academic staff of Eötvös Loránd University
Hungarian women literary critics
20th-century Hungarian women writers
21st-century Hungarian women writers
Attila József Prize recipients